The 2016 Vietnam Open Grand Prix, is the eleventh Grand Prix's badminton tournament of the 2016 BWF Grand Prix and Grand Prix Gold. The tournament will be held at the Nguyen Du Stadium in Ho Chi Minh City, Vietnam on 18–24 July 2016 and has a total purse of $55,000.

Men's singles

Seeds

  Hu Yun (withdrew)
  Ng Ka Long (withdrew)
  Wei Nan (first round)
  Wong Wing Ki (champion)
  Tanongsak Saensomboonsuk (second round)
  Nguyen Tien Minh (first round)
  Wang Tzu-wei (third round)
  Zulfadli Zulkiffli (quarterfinal)
  Sameer Verma (withdrew)
  Vladimir Malkov (second round)
  Chong Wei Feng (final)
  Kanta Tsuneyama (withdrew)
  Jacob Maliekal (first round)
  Lin Yu-hsien (semifinal)
  Harsheel Dani (second round)
  Muhammad Bayu Pangisthu (second round)

Finals

Top half

Section 1

Section 2

Section 3

Section 4

Bottom half

Section 5

Section 6

Section 7

Section 8

Women's singles

Seeds

  Hsu Ya-ching (semifinal)
  Yip Pui Yin (withdrew)
  Cheung Ngan Yi (quarterfinal)
  Vu Thi Trang (quarterfinal)
  Fitriani (quarterfinal)
  Natalia Perminova (first round)
  Hana Ramadhini (first round)
  Nanna Vainio (first round)

Finals

Top half

Section 1

Section 2

Bottom half

Section 3

Section 4

Men's doubles

Seeds

  Koo Kien Keat / Tan Boon Heong (final)
  Lee Jhe-huei / Lee Yang (champion)
  Or Chin Chung / Tang Chun Man (quarterfinal)
  Hardianto / Kenas Adi Haryanto (semifinal)
  Hoon Thien How / Teo Kok Siang (second round)
  Danny Bawa Chrisnanta / Hendra Wijaya (first round)
  Hendra Aprida Gunawan / Markis Kido (second round)
  Fajar Alfian / Muhammad Rian Ardianto (second round)

Finals

Top half

Section 1

Section 2

Bottom half

Section 3

Section 4

Women's doubles

Seeds

  Gabriela Stoeva / Stefani Stoeva (quarterfinal)
  Poon Lok Yan / Tse Ying Suet (withdrew)
  Della Destiara Haris / Rosyita Eka Putri Sari (champion)
  Chayanit Chaladchalam / Phataimas Muenwong (quarterfinal)
  Tiara Rosalia Nuraidah / Rizki Amelia Pradipta (final)
  Shiho Tanaka / Koharu Yonemoto (quarterfinal)
  Rie Etoh / Aoi Matsuda (first round)
  Chow Mei Kuan / Lee Meng Yean (first round)

Finals

Top half

Section 1

Section 2

Bottom half

Section 3

Section 4

Mixed doubles

Seeds

  Terry Hee Yong Kai / Tan Wei Han (first round)
  Hafiz Faisal / Shella Devi Aulia (semifinal)
  Tan Kian Meng / Lai Pei Jing (champion)
  Alfian Eko Prasetya / Annisa Saufika (final)
  Rafiddias Akhdan Nugroho / Richi Puspita Dili (second round)
  Chang Ko-chi / Chang Hsin-tien (quarterfinal)
  Edi Subaktiar / Masita Mahmudin (quarterfinal)
  Irfan Fadhilah / Weni Anggraini (quarterfinal)

Finals

Top half

Section 1

Section 2

Bottom half

Section 3

Section 4

References

External links 
 Tournament Link

Vietnam Open (badminton)
BWF Grand Prix Gold and Grand Prix
2016 in Vietnamese sport
Vietnam Open Grand Prix